Fredric R. Mann (September 13, 1903 – February 26, 1987) was an industrialist and patron of the arts who helped finance music centers in Philadelphia and Tel Aviv.  He was the first United States Ambassador to Barbados, serving from 1967 until 1969. In 1968, his portfolio expanded to being United States Special Representative to several Caribbean islands.

He explained his philanthropy by saying: “The Hebrew word for charity is tzedakah, which really means justice. If you live opulently, you have to share with the less fortunate.”

Career

In his early 20s, Mann founded and directed the Seaboard Container Company which made cardboard boxes.  It was known later as the National Container Corporation, and still later as Mann Kraft.

As an arts patron, Mann arranged for Zubin Mehta's first conducting appearance in the United States at Robin Hood Dell (now known as the Mann Center for the Performing Arts in his honor) in 1960. He was one of the founders of what is now known as the Israel Philharmonic Orchestra was founded.  Because he provided much of the financing for their auditorium which opened in 1957, it was named the Fredric R. Mann Auditorium.

Mann was born in Russia and came to the United States in 1905, moving to New Haven. Mann graduated from the Wharton School of Business at the University of Pennsylvania, He died of cancer in Miami at the age of 83 years and had homes in Miami, Philadelphia, and Manhattan.

References

External links 

 MSS 154, Fredric R. Mann Papers in the Irving S. Gilmore Music Library of Yale University. 

1903 births
1987 deaths
Ambassadors of the United States to Barbados
American patrons of the arts
Wharton School of the University of Pennsylvania alumni
American company founders
Deaths from cancer in Florida
20th-century American philanthropists
20th-century American diplomats